Marshall Burdekin (11 April 1837 – 10 November 1886) was an Australian politician.

He was born in Sydney to merchant Thomas Burdekin and Mary Ann Bossley. Educated at Darlinghurst, he received a Master of Arts from the University of Sydney in 1859 and was called to the bar later that year. He had inherited a large fortune from his father in 1844.

He was elected to the New South Wales Legislative Assembly for Liverpool Plains at the 1863 by-election, transferring to The Williams at the 1864–65 election. In 1866 he was appointed Colonial Treasurer, but he was defeated at the ministerial by-election, and thus held office for less than a month. He returned to the Assembly at the 1867 by-election for East Sydney, but he did not re-contest in 1869.

Subsequently he lived mainly overseas, falling seriously ill in America in 1877 and suffering from ill health continuously until his death in England in 1886.

His brother Sydney was also a colonial politician.

References

 

1837 births
1886 deaths
Members of the New South Wales Legislative Assembly
Treasurers of New South Wales
19th-century Australian politicians